Bidens heterodoxa, the Connecticut beggarticks, is a North American species of flowering plant in the family Asteraceae. It is native to eastern Canada (Québec, New Brunswick, Prince Edward Island) and the northeastern United States (Connecticut).

Bidens heterodoxa is an annual  herb up to 50 cm (20 inches) tall. It produces as many as 3 flower heads containing yellow disc florets but usually no ray florets (occasionally 1, 2, or 3). The species grows mostly along the banks of estuaries and coastal salt marshes.

References

heterodoxa
Flora of Eastern Canada
Flora of Connecticut
Plants described in 1913
Salt marsh plants